Alexandria Patrice Simmons (born July 7, 1986) is an American basketball coach and former player who is currently the head women's basketball coach at Gardner–Webb University.

Playing career 
Simmons played college basketball at Tennessee from 2004 to 2009, where she won two NCAA championships as a player.

Coaching career 
Simmons began her coaching career as a graduate student manager at Kansas in 2009. She was later an assistant coach at Middle Tennessee and Ole Miss, working under her former high school coach Rick Insell at Middle Tennessee and Insell's son Matt at Ole Miss.

Gardner–Webb 
Simmons was named the head coach at Gardner–Webb on April 24, 2018.

Head coaching record

References

External links 
 
 Gardner–Webb Runnin' Bulldogs profile

1986 births
Living people
People from Vernon Parish, Louisiana
People from Shelbyville, Tennessee
Basketball players from Louisiana
Basketball players from Tennessee
Basketball coaches from Louisiana
Basketball coaches from Tennessee
Power forwards (basketball)
Centers (basketball)
Tennessee Lady Volunteers basketball players
Kansas Jayhawks women's basketball coaches
Middle Tennessee Blue Raiders women's basketball coaches
Ole Miss Rebels women's basketball coaches
Gardner–Webb Runnin' Bulldogs women's basketball coaches
21st-century American women